Korovino is a rural locality (a village) in Nizhne-Vazhskoye Rural Settlement, Verkhovazhsky District, Vologda Oblast, Russia. The population was 9 as of 2002.

Geography 
Korovino is located 10 km south of Verkhovazhye (the district's administrative centre) by road. Kukolovskaya is the nearest rural locality.

References 

Rural localities in Verkhovazhsky District